Decker Prairie is an Unincorporated community in Montgomery County, Texas, United States. The community is named for Isaac Decker, who settled in the area around 1839.

Education
Tomball Independent School District operates schools in the area. Zoned schools include:
 Decker Prairie Elementary School
 Tomball Intermediate School
 Tomball Junior High School
 Tomball High School

Lone Star College (originally the North Harris Montgomery Community College District) serves the community. The territory in Tomball ISD joined the community college district in 1982. The system operates the Fairbanks Center in unincorporated Harris County; Fairbanks Center is a part of Lone Star College–CyFair.

References

External links

Unincorporated communities in Texas
Unincorporated communities in Montgomery County, Texas